FotoFilm Tijuana is a festival that takes place annually in Tijuana, Baja California, Mexico. It is a photography and film festival and had over 22,000 attendees in 2017. Held in July at the Tijuana Cultural Center, the event is a showcase for Mexican and international filmmakers, photographers and performers. The festival comprises competitive sections for short films, and includes feature films and documentary films. 

The first edition was held in 2017, and included the films William: El Nuevo Maestro del Judo, La Habitación, and Heroyna in the main selection. The second edition took place on July 27–31, 2018 at the Tijuana Cultural Center, and included 14 feature films, 12 short films, and a contest for new directors through FilmFreeway, which resulted in six finalists and a winner for the Best of Show award.

Background
Mexican photographer Julio Rodríguez created FotoFilm Tijuana after noticing the rise of audiovisual recordings with smartphones and tablet computers. As part of daily life, recording videos and taking photographs, "is within everyone's reach", Rodríguez said to Mexican newspaper Milenio. He also noted that users are creating simple and free content and this creative facility creates the bases of interest in the public for this kind of events. Using as a reference renowned Mexican film festivals held at Morelia and Guadalajara, and with the intention to expand the exhibition time of Mexican films in theaters, the festival was located in the Tijuana Cultural Center's movie theater. At a press conference held on June 28, 2017, FotoFilm Tijuana was presented as a "platform for exhibition, exchange, learning and promotion of photography and cinema", and the main program included conferences, master classes, panel discussions, workshops, feature and short film exhibitions. The festival also featured work from Mexican filmmakers, bands and performers based in Baja California and a photo contest. Regarding the festival, the Municipal President of Tijuana Juan Manuel Gastélum, commented that "art and culture are necessary elements in education and human development" and that the event is "a great opportunity to present the work of local artists". The first edition of FotoFilm Tijuana was held from July 14–17, 2017, and according to Rodríguez had 30 different activities, 41 speakers, 180 featured artists, and 22,000 attendees.

Editions
In 2017, FotoFilm Tijuana was held at the Tijuana Cultural Center from July 14–17. The film William: El Nuevo Maestro del Judo, directed by Omar Guzmán and Ricardo Silva; the anthology film La Habitación, directed by Carlos Carrera, Daniel Giménez Cacho, Carlos Bolado, Ernesto Contreras, Iván Ávila Dueñas, Alfonso Pineda Ulloa, Alejandro Valle, and Natalia Beristáin; and Heroyna, directed by Alejandro Solórzano, were included in the main program. A selection of short films entitled "Desde el Norte" ("From the North") included Microcastillo by Alejandra Villalba García, Al Otro Lado by Rodrigo Álvarez Flores, Leche by Gilberto González Penilla, and Hambre by Alejandro Montalvo, with the latter winning the Audience Award. Mexican actor Noé Hernández, screenwriter María Diego, photographers Rogelio Cuellar, Brandon Echeverrys, Dolores Medel, and Greg Smith, were among the speakers featured.

The second edition of FotoFilm Tijuana, was also held at the Tijuana Cultural Center from July 27–31, 2018. The short film selection was divided into animated, documentary, fiction and music video fields; and as an incentive for filmmakers from the Mexican states of Baja California, Baja California Sur, Chihuahua, Durango, Sinaloa, and Sonora also could be included in the "Desde el Norte" section. For the first time all entries entered through the website Film Freeway and a prize equivalent to USD1,000 was awarded to the "Best of Show". Also, for the official selection, 14 films were featured, including Avenida Bugambilia, by Paulina Casmur; Ayer Maravilla Fui by Gabriel Mariño; Ayúdame a Pasar la Noche, by José Ramón Chávez Delgado; Cría Puercos by Ehécatl Garage; El Vigilante by Diego Ros; Etiqueta No Rigurosa by Cristina Herrera Bórquez; Juan y Vanesa by Ianis Guerrero; Los Adioses by Natalia Beristáin; Los Años Azules by Sofía Gómez Córdova; Mente Revolver by Alejandro Ramírez Corona; the anthology film México Bárbaro II, directed by Abraham Sánchez, Carlos Meléndez, Christian Cueva, Diego Cohen, Fernando Urdapilleta, Lex Ortega, Michelle Garza, Ricardo Farías, and Sergio Tello; Piérdete Entre los Muertos by Rubén Gutiérrez; Sueño en Otro Idioma by Ernesto Contreras; and Todos Los Viernes Son Santos by Héctor Villanueva. Also, a selection of 12 short films produced by the Mexican Institute of Cinematography (IMCINE) and the Centro de Capacitación Cinematográfica (CCC), were included.

References

Culture in Tijuana
Film festivals in Mexico
Photography festivals
Summer events in Mexico
Events in Baja California